Ambala is the village of Bechraji taluka in Gujarat and it is far from 15 km from Bechraji. Shree Shaktimata temple is well known in village. There is majority of 72 Kadva Patidar and Panchal. There is also public like thakor, chamar, vaghri.

Janmastami, dashera are celebrated widely in this village. Dashera is the biggest festival of the village and around region.
Ambala primary school and Kishan Vidyalaya secondary school are the best schools in Bechraji taluka. Students from Kisan Vidyalaya are taking good mark all over Modhera centre.

Modhera sun temple is 14 km far from Ambala. Ambala is the well developed village. The nearest railway station is 3 km far from ambalaat that railway stand people can go to Ahmedabad, Chansma, Ranuj.

Mehsana district is 40 km far from Ambala. The nearest villages are Delmal, Khambhel, Mandali, Itoda. HASNFEER SAHEB DARGAH the place of worship of Daudi vohra at Delmal is 5 km Far. Ambala village has Dudhsagar Dairy with  a bulk cooler. There are many diploma and Degree engineers in Ambala. 

 Ambala is the biggest village of 72 kadva patidar. Kamboi highway is 10 km far. Population is around 2000.
There is also good roads and a water facility in the village. There is cultivation of many crops. Farming and animal husbandry are the major source of income.

References

Mehsana district

There is majority of 72 Kadva Patidar and Thakor community.